The Billeting Act 1679 (31 Car 2 c 1) was an Act of the Parliament of England.

The majority of the Act, excluding the final section, was repealed by the Statute Law Revision Act 1863. The remaining section was repealed by the Statute Law Revision Act 1966.

References
Halsbury's Statutes

Footnotes

Acts of the Parliament of England
1679 in law
1679 in England